Phragmacossia micromaculata is a species of moth of the family Cossidae. It is found in Afghanistan.

References

Moths described in 2009
Zeuzerinae